The Red Deer Advocate is a daily newspaper in Red Deer, Alberta, Canada.

Published by Black Press, the newspaper was first established in 1901 as the Red Deer Echo, changing its name to Alberta Advocate in 1903 and Red Deer Advocate in 1906. Originally it was a weekly newspaper issued on Fridays.

The Advocate now publishes daily, from Tuesday to Saturday as the Monday edition was dropped late in 2016, with the slogan "Central Alberta's Daily Newspaper". The newspaper publishes weekly supplements called Central Alberta Life (for rural communities), and owns eleven weekly newspapers covering outlying Alberta towns: the Bashaw Star (Bashaw), Castor Advance (Castor), Lacombe Express (Lacombe), Pipestone Flyer (Pipestone), Ponoka News (Ponoka), Rimbey Review (Rimbey), Stettler Independent  (Stettler) and Sylvan Lake News (Sylvan Lake). In addition to printing its own weekly and daily products, the Advocate presses also print, by contract, several other newspapers covering communities in Alberta, British Columbia, Saskatchewan and Manitoba.

See also
List of newspapers in Canada

References

External links
 Red Deer Advocate

Mass media in Red Deer, Alberta
Black Press newspapers
Newspapers established in 1901
Daily newspapers published in Alberta
1901 establishments in Alberta